Seitokai Yakuindomo is an anime series adapted from the manga of the same title written and illustrated by Tozen Ujiie. Produced by GoHands, the anime aired in Japan between July 4 and September 26, 2010. Original video animation episodes of the anime have been shipping with the limited editions of the manga volumes, beginning with the fifth volume released on April 15, 2011. These episodes are also produced by GoHands and they are numbered as if they continued the TV series. A second season, titled Seitokai Yakuindomo* (生徒会役員共*), premiered on January 4, 2014. All episodes directed by Hiromitsu Kanazawa.

Episode list

TV series (2010)

OVAs (2011-2013)

Seitokai Yakuindomo* (2014)

Seitokai Yakuindomo* OVAs (2014-2020)

References

Seitokai Yakuindomo